The 25th Field Artillery Regiment is a field artillery regiment of the United States Army, first constituted 5 July 1918 in the National Army (USA). Although the regiment did not see action during World War I, elements participated in World War II, Vietnam, Panama (including Operation Just Cause), the Gulf War, and the Global War on Terrorism. Currently the regiment one active battalion, a towed light artillery units equipped with the M119A3 105mm Howitzer and the M777A2 155mm Howitzer. The 5th Battalion is assigned to the 3rd Brigade Combat Team, 10th Mountain Division at Fort Polk, Louisiana. The 4th Battalion was inactivated on 14 August 2014.

4th Battalion history

World War I and interwar period
The 4th Battalion, 25th Field Artillery traces its history to Battery D, 25th Field Artillery Regiment, which was originally constituted on 5 July 1918 in the National Army as part of the 25th Field Artillery Regiment in the 9th Infantry Division. The unit did not see action during World War One. Following the conclusion of the war, the battery was demobilized on 8 February 1919 at Camp McClellan, Alabama. The unit was reconstituted in the Regular Army on 22 December 1920 as Battery D, 25th Field Artillery Regiment (Philippine Scouts) at Fort William McKinley, Philippine Islands. Along with the 31st Infantry Regiment and other units, the regiment formed part of the Philippine Division. As part of the Philippine Division, the regiment was made up of mostly native Filipinos assigned to the United States Army Philippine Department, under the command of American officers. On 1 January 1930 the 25th Field Artillery Regiment was relieved of duty with the Philippine Division and reassigned to the 9th Infantry Division (inactive). At this time the regiment dropped the Philippine Scout designation that it had had since 1920. On 1 December 1934 the 25th Field Artillery Regiment was activated at Madison Barracks, New York.

World War II
During the expansion of the United States Army in preparation for World War II, the unit was reorganized on 30 December 1940 as Battery A, 25th Field Artillery Battalion. On 19 December 1942 the unit was again reconstituted as Battery A, 604th Field Artillery Battalion and assigned to Camp Carson, Colorado as part of the newly formed 10th Infantry Division (Mountain). As part of the 10th Mountain Division, the unit departed the United States for the European Theater of Operations, arriving in Italy in January 1945. During World War II the unit earned campaign streamers for actions in the North Apennines, Po Valley, Rhineland, Ardennes-Alsace, and Central Europe. Following the conclusion of World War II in both Europe and the Pacific, Battery A, 604th Field Artillery Battalion was redesignated as Battery A, 25th Field Artillery Battalion and shortly thereafter inactivated.

Post-war
On 29 November 1949 Battery A, 25th Field Artillery Regiment was redesignated as Battery A, 25th Parachute Field Artillery Battalion and consolidated with the 25th Field Artillery Battalion. The consolidated unit was assigned to the 10th Light Infantry Division (formerly 10th Mountain Division) until inactivated on 1 July 1957 and relieved from the 10th Light Infantry Division. During this time, from 1948 to 1953, the 10th Infantry Division served as a training organization at Fort Riley, Kansas. 10th Infantry Division was deployed to Germany, replacing the 1st Infantry Division at Würzburg, serving as part of the North Atlantic Treaty Organization defensive force. The division served in Germany for four years, until it was rotated out and replaced by the 3rd Infantry Division. The division moved to Fort Benning, Georgia and was inactivated on 14 June 1958

Vietnam War and after
On 31 July 1959 the unit was redesignated as HHB, 4th Battalion, 25th Field Artillery Regiment and later redesignated on 19 June 1964 as Battery D, 25th Field Artillery Regiment. The unit was activated 25 June 1964 in Germany but again shortly inactivated on 5 June 1967 in Germany. On 25 September 1969 Battery D, 25th Field Artillery Regiment was activated in the Republic of Vietnam where it saw action and earned campaign credit for participation in the "Sanctuary Counteroffensive" and "Counteroffensive, Phase VII" operations. Battery D, 25th Field Artillery Regiment was again inactivated on 1 August 1970 in Vietnam.

On 21 June 1976 Battery D, 25th Field Artillery Regiment was assigned to the 1st Infantry Division and activated at Fort Riley, Kansas where it remained in active service until 1 July 1995 when it was again inactivated. During that time D Battery fought in Operation Desert Storm as a target acquisition battery in the 1st Infantry Division. Battery H had a RADAR section participate in Operation Just Cause in 1989.

Global War on Terrorism
The 4th Battalion, 25th Field Artillery was reactivated as the direct support fires battalion for 3rd Brigade Combat Team, 10th Mountain Division 16 September 2004 as part of the transformation of the 10th Mountain Division into a modular BCT division. This was the first time since 1957 that the unit again found itself a part of the Army's 10th Mountain Division. Since modularization, the battalion has been organized in a "2 x 8" structure, meaning that the battalion has two firing batteries (Alpha and Bravo) of eight M119A2 howitzers each, in addition to a headquarters battery and a forward support company.

The battalion deployed with 3rd Brigade Combat Team, 10th Mountain Division to Afghanistan in 2006–2007.

The battalion deployed with 3rd Brigade again in 2009. During this deployment, the brigade assumed responsibility over a number of provinces in eastern Afghanistan under the control of Regional Command East, and the 4th Battalion, 25th Field Artillery provided artillery fires for the brigade using the M777 towed 155mm howitzer.

In March 2011, the battalion again deployed, this time to Kandahar Province, southern Afghanistan in support of Operation Enduring Freedom XI-XII. Although the battalion deployed to Afghanistan with their howitzers, the unit did not perform a firing mission and was instead utilized as a maneuver, "battle space owner" alongside the brigade's infantry battalions. The battalion operated in the Maywand District of Kandahar Province. Throughout the deployment, battalion headquarters were located at Forward Operating Base (FOB) Azzizulah with Alpha Battery at Combat Outpost (COP) Azimjan Kariz and Bravo Battery at COP Ghundy Ghar. To conduct their maneuver missions, Alpha Battery was reinforced with a platoon from the attached 2nd Battalion, 34th Armor Regiment, and Bravo Battery was reinforced with a platoon from the brigade's own 2nd Battalion, 87th Infantry Regiment.

The battalion's final deployment was in 2013–2014, returning to eastern Afghanistan as a Security Force Advise and Assist Team at Camp Clark in Khost Province.  HHB and the SFAAT, augmented by C/3-71 CAV, supported the 2/203 Corps while Bravo Battery conducted a traditional firing battery mission, supporting the Polish Army in Ghazni Province, 2nd Battalion, 87th Infantry in Logar Province, HHB and the SFAAT in Khost Province, and 1st Platoon, Alpha Battery supported the BCT HQ and 710 BSB in Paktiya Province. Bravo Battery was the last unit in Afghanistan to fire the M119A2 howitzer in support of combat operations and occupy all hybrid firing points consisting of both the M119A2 howitzer and the M777A2 howitzer.

5th Battalion history
Constituted 5 July 1918 in the National Army as Battery E, 25th Field Artillery, an element of the 9th Division.

Organized 2 August 1918 at Camp McClellan, Alabama.

Demobilized 8 February 1919 at Camp McClellan, Alabama.

Reconstituted 22 December 1920 in the Regular Army as Battery E, 25th Field Artillery (Philippine Scouts).

Organized 26 September 1921 at Fort William McKinley, Philippine Islands, as an element of the Philippine Division.

Inactivated 30 September 1922 at Fort Stotsenburg, Philippine Islands.

(25th Field Artillery relieved 1 January 1930 from assignment to the Philippine Division and assigned to the 9th Division; Philippine Scouts concurrently removed as a parenthetical designation).

Activated 1 December 1934 at Madison Barracks, New York.

(25th Field Artillery relieved 16 October 1939 from assignment to the 9th Division).

Reorganized and redesignated 30 December 1940 as Battery B, 25th Field Artillery Battalion.

Inactivated 21 March 1946 at Camp Kilmer, New Jersey.

(25th Field Artillery Battalion redesignated 1 August 1946 as the 25th Parachute Field Artillery Battery and activated at Fort Benning, Georgia; inactivated 14 November 1946 at Fort Benning, Georgia).

Former Battery B, 25th Field Artillery Battalion, redesignated 29 November 1949 as Battery B, 25th Parachute Field Artillery Battalion; concurrently, consolidated with Battery B, 25th Field Artillery Battalion (active), and consolidated unit designated as Battery B, 25th Field Artillery Battalion, an element of the 10th Infantry Division.

Inactivated 1 July 1957 in Germany and relieved from assignment to the 10th Infantry Division.

Redesignated 31 July 1959 as Headquarters and Headquarters Battery, 5th Battalion, 25th Artillery.

Redesignated 1 September 1971 as Headquarters and Headquarters Battery, 5th Battalion, 25th Field Artillery.

Redesignated 20 March 1978 as Battery E, 25th Field Artillery, assigned to the 2d Infantry Division, and activated in Korea.

Inactivated 16 June 1988 in Korea and relieved from assignment to the 2d Infantry Division.

Redesignated 16 January 2005 as Headquarters and Headquarters Battery, 5th Battalion, 25th Field Artillery, assigned to the 4th Brigade Combat Team, 10th Mountain Division, and activated at Fort Polk, Louisiana (organic elements concurrently constituted and activated).

Battalion redesignated 1 October 2005 as the 5th Battalion, 25th Field Artillery Regiment.

Lineage
Constituted 5 July 1918 in the National Army as the 25th Field Artillery and assigned to the 9th Infantry Division (United States)
Organized 2 August 1918 at Camp McClellan, Alabama
Demobilized 8 February 1919 at Camp McClellan.
Reconstituted 22 December 1920 in the regular army as the 25th field Artillery (Philippine Scouts).
Organized 26 September 1921 at Fort William McKinley, Philippine Islands, as an element of the Philippine Division.
Inactivated 30 September 1922 at Fort Stotsenburg, Philippine Islands.
Redesignated as the 25th field Artillery, 1 January 1930; concurrently relieved from the Philippine Division and assigned to the 9th Division. (2nd Battalion activated 1 December 1934 at Madison Barracks, New York) Relieved from the 9th division in 1939
Redesignated 30 December 1940 as the 25th Field artillery Battalion; concurrently organized at Henry Barracks, Puerto Rico with personnel and equipment from the 2nd Battalion 25th field Artillery.
Inactivated 21 March 1946 at Camp Kilmer, New Jersey
Redesignated 1 August 1946 as the 25th Parachute Field artillery Battery. and activated at Fort Benning, Georgia; inactivated 14 November 1946 at Fort Benning, Georgia

Distinctive unit insignia
Description
A Gold color metal and enamel device 15/16 inch (2.38 cm) in height consisting of a shield blazoned:  Gules, a sea-lion in dexter paw a sword, all Or.  Attached below the shield a Gold scroll inscribed “TACE ET FACE” in Black letters.
Symbolism
The shield is red for Artillery.  The sea-lion is taken from the coat of arms of the Philippine Islands, where the organization was assigned during its period of active service.
Background
The distinctive unit insignia was originally approved for the 25th Field Artillery Regiment on 29 March 1935.  It was redesignated for the 25th Field Artillery Battalion on 29 March 1942.  It was redesignated for the 25th Artillery Regiment on 14 August 1958.  The insignia was redesignated effective 1 September 1971, for the 25th Field Artillery Regiment.  It was amended to update the description on 24 September 2004.

Coat of arms
Blazon
Shield- Gules, a sea-lion Or langued and armed Azure, in dexter paw a sword Argent.
Crest- From a wreath of the colors Or and Gules two arms vambraced, counter-embowed and fretted Proper the dexter forearm charged with a Taeguk Gules and Azure, hand grasping a sword Proper, the sinister arm charged with a pellet bearing a fleur-de-lis Argent, the hand grasping five lightning bolts radiated to dexter chief of the first.
Motto- TACE ET FACE (Be Silent and Act).
Symbolism
Shield- The shield is red for Artillery.  The sea-lion is taken from the coat of arms of the Philippine Islands, where the organization was assigned during its period of active service.
Crest- The arm holding the five lightning flashes and charged with a fleur-de-lis alludes to the five battle honors received in France and Germany in World War II.  The arm holding the sword and charged with a Taeguk refers to service in Korea.
Background- The coat of arms was originally approved for the 25th Field Artillery Regiment on 29 March 1935.  It was redesignated for the 25th Field Artillery Battalion on 16 March 1942.  It was redesignated for the 25th Artillery Regiment on 14 August 1958.  It was amended to add a crest on 14 July 1965.  The insignia was redesignated effective 1 September 1971, for the 25th Field Artillery Regiment.  The coat of arms was amended to correct the blazon of the crest on 24 September 2004.

Configuration

Active units
 5th Battalion 25th Field Artillery Regiment 
Alpha ("Ares") BatteryBravo ("Bulldog") BatteryCharlie ("Carnage") BatteryHeadquarters and Headquarters Battery (HHB) ("Hydra") Fox ("Fury") Company, 710th Brigade Support Battalion (F-710th BSB) (Forward Support Company)

Inactive units
Throughout the history of the regiment, separate batteries were established to augment division artillery and artillery brigades. During the Cold War period numerous target acquisition batteries (TAB) were established and assigned as divisional assets in division artillery as separate units. These TABs operated various target acquisition systems, including the AN/TPQ-36 and AN/TPQ-37 Firefinder RADAR systems, and fielded organic fire support elements and artillery survey sections. The majority of these separate batteries were dissolved or absorbed by other elements in the late 1990s.

BATTERY A, 25th FIELD ARTILLERY Lineage RA (inactive)
 
Constituted 5 July 1918 in the National Army as Battery A, 25th Field
Artillery, an element of the 9th Division. Organized 2 August 1918 at Camp
McClellan, Alabama. Demobilized 8 February 1919 at Camp McClellan, Alabama.
Reconstituted 22 December 1920 in the Regular Army as Battery A, 25th Field
Artillery (Philippine Scouts). Organized 26 September 1921 at Fort William
McKinley, Philippine Islands, as an element of the Philippine Division. Inactivated
30 September 1922 at Fort Stotsenburg, Philippine Islands. (25th Field Artillery
relieved 1 January 1930 from assignment to the Philippine Division and assigned
to the 9th Division; Philippine Scouts concurrently removed as a parenthetical designation.
Relieved 16 October 1939 from assignment to the 9th Division.)
Absorbed 30 December 1940 by Battery A, 25th Field Artillery Battalion
(active). (Battery D, 25th Field Artillery, reorganized and redesignated 30
December 1940 as Battery A, 25th Field Artillery Battalion; inactivated 21 March
1946 at Camp Kilmer, New Jersey [25th Field Artillery Battalion redesignated 1
August 1946 as the 25th Parachute Field Artillery Battery and activated at Fort
Benning, Georgia; inactivated 14 November 1946 at Fort Benning, Georgia]; former
Battery A, 25th Field Artillery Battalion, redesignated 29 November 1949
as Battery A, 25th Parachute Field Artillery Battalion; concurrently, consolidated
with Battery A, 25th Field Artillery Battalion [active], and consolidated unit designated
as Battery A, 25th Field Artillery Battalion, an element of the 10th Infantry
Division.) Former Battery A, 25th Field Artillery, reconstituted 1 July 1957 in the
Regular Army.
 
Redesignated 24 April 1958 as Headquarters and Headquarters Battery, 1st
Observation Battalion, 25th Artillery (organic elements concurrently constituted).
Battalion activated 25 June 1958 in Korea. Reorganized and redesignated 25 June
1961 as the 1st Target Acquisition Battalion, 25th Artillery. Redesignated 10
January 1966 as the 1st Battalion, 25th Artillery. Redesignated 1 September 1971
as the 1st Battalion, 25th Field Artillery. Inactivated (less Battery C) 21 December
1976 at Fort Bragg, North Carolina (Battery C concurrently inactivated at Fort
Sill, Oklahoma). Headquarters and Headquarters Battery, 1st Battalion, 25th Field
Artillery, redesignated 1 April 1984 as Battery A, 25th Field Artillery, assigned
to the 3rd Infantry Division, and activated in Germany. Relieved 16 May 1992
from assignment to the 3rd Infantry Division. Inactivated 15 September 1997 in
Germany.

Campaign Participation Credit
World War II–EAME
Rhineland
Ardennes-Alsace
Central Europe

Decorations
Army Superior Unit Award, Streamer embroidered 1995–1996 (Battery A,
25th Field Artillery, cited; DA GO 25, 2001)

BATTERY B, 25th FIELD ARTILLERY Lineage RA (inactive)
 
Constituted 5 July 1918 in the National Army as Battery B, 25th Field
Artillery, an element of the 9th Division. Organized 2 August 1918 at Camp
McClellan, Alabama. Demobilized 8 February 1919 at Camp McClellan, Alabama.
Reconstituted 22 December 1920 in the Regular Army as Battery B, 25th Field
Artillery (Philippine Scouts). Organized 26 September 1921 at Fort William
McKinley, Philippine Islands, as an element of the Philippine Division. Inactivated
30 September 1922 at Fort Stotsenburg, Philippine Islands. (25th Field Artillery
relieved 1 January 1930 from assignment to the Philippine Division and assigned
to the 9th Division; Philippine Scouts concurrently removed as a parenthetical designation.
Relieved 16 October 1939 from assignment to the 9th Division.)
Absorbed 30 December 1940 by Battery B, 25th Field Artillery Battalion
(active). (Battery E, 25th Field Artillery, reorganized and redesignated 30
December 1940 as Battery B, 25th Field Artillery Battalion; inactivated 21 March
1946 at Camp Kilmer, New Jersey [25th Field Artillery Battalion redesignated 1
August 1946 as the 25th Parachute Field Artillery Battery and activated at Fort
Benning, Georgia; inactivated 14 November 1946 at Fort Benning, Georgia]; former
Battery B, 25th Field Artillery Battalion, redesignated 29 November 1949
as Battery B, 25th Parachute Field Artillery Battalion; concurrently, consolidated
with Battery B, 25th Field Artillery Battalion [active], and consolidated unit designated
as Battery B, 25th Field Artillery Battalion, an element of the 10th Infantry
Division.) Former Battery B, 25th Field Artillery, reconstituted 1 July 1957 in the
Regular Army.
 
Redesignated 1 June 1958 as Headquarters and Headquarters Battery, 2d
Observation Battalion, 25th Artillery (organic elements concurrently constituted).
Battalion activated 25 June 1958 in Germany. Reorganized and redesignated
23 September 1961 as the 2d Target Acquisition Battalion, 25th Artillery.
Redesignated 15 April 1968 as the 2d Battalion, 25th Artillery. Redesignated 1
September 1971 as the 2d Battalion, 25th Field Artillery. Inactivated 20 September
1978 in Germany. Headquarters and Headquarters Battery, 2d Battalion, 25th Field
Artillery, redesignated 1 April 1984 as Battery B, 25th Field Artillery, assigned to
the 1st Armored Division, and activated in Germany. Relieved 16 May 1992 from
assignment to the 1st Armored Division and assigned to the 3d Infantry Division.
Relieved 16 February 1996 from assignment to the 3d Infantry Division and
assigned to the 1st Infantry Division. Inactivated 15 September 1999 in Germany
and relieved from assignment to the 1st Infantry Division.

Campaign Participation Credit
 
World War II–EAME
Rhineland
Ardennes-Alsace
Central Europe
Southwest Asia
Defense of Saudi Arabia
Liberation and Defense of Kuwait
Cease-Fire

Decorations
Meritorious Unit Commendation (Army), Streamer embroidered
SOUTHWEST ASIA (Battery B, 25th Field Artillery, cited; DA GO 1, 1996)
Army Superior Unit Award, Streamer embroidered 1995–1996 (Battery B,
25th Field Artillery, cited; DA GO 25, 2001)

BATTERY C, 25th FIELD ARTILLERY Lineage RA (inactive)
 
Constituted 5 July 1918 in the National Army as Battery C, 25th Field
Artillery, an element of the 9th Division. Organized 2 August 1918 at Camp
McClellan, Alabama. Demobilized 8 February 1919 at Camp McClellan,
Alabama. Reconstituted 22 December 1920 in the Regular Army as Battery C,
25th Field Artillery (Philippine Scouts). Organized 26 December 1921 at Fort
William McKinley, Philippine Islands, as an element of the Philippine Division.
Inactivated 30 September 1922 at Fort Stotsenburg, Philippine Islands. (25th Field
Artillery relieved 1 September 1930 from assignment to the Philippine Division
and assigned to the 9th Division; Philippine Scouts concurrently removed as a
parenthetical designation. Relieved 16 October 1939 from assignment to the 9th
Division.)
 
Absorbed 30 December 1940 by Battery C, 25th Field Artillery Battalion
(active). (Battery F, 25th Field Artillery, reorganized and redesignated 30 December
1940 as Battery C, 25th Field Artillery Battalion; inactivated 21 March 1946 at
Camp Kilmer, New Jersey [25th Field Artillery Battalion redesignated 1 August
1946 as the 25th Parachute Field Artillery Battery and activated at Fort Benning,
Georgia; inactivated 14 November 1946 at Fort Benning, Georgia]; former Battery
C, 25th Field Artillery Battalion, redesignated 29 November 1949 as Battery C,
25th Parachute Field Artillery Battalion; concurrently, consolidated with Battery
C, 25th Field Artillery Battalion [active], and consolidated unit redesignated as
Battery C, 25th Field Artillery Battalion, an element of the 10th Infantry Division.)
Former Battery C, 25th Field Artillery, reconstituted 1 July 1957 in the Regular
Army.
 
Redesignated 2 June 1958 as Headquarters and Headquarters Battery, 3d
Observation Battalion, 25th Artillery (organic elements concurrently constituted).
Battalion activated 25 June 1958 at Fort Sill, Oklahoma. Inactivated 23
December 1959 at Fort Sill, Oklahoma. Redesignated 8 August 1962 as the 3d
Target Acquisition Battalion, 25th Artillery. Activated 23 August 1962 at Fort
Chaffee, Arkansas. Redesignated 15 April 1968 as the 3d Battalion, 25th Artillery.
Inactivated 20 February 1970 at Fort Sill, Oklahoma. Redesignated 1 September
1971 as the 3d Battalion, 25th Field Artillery. Headquarters and Headquarters
Battery, 3d Battalion, 25th Field Artillery, redesignated 21 December 1976 as
Battery C, 25th Field Artillery, and activated at Fort Sill, Oklahoma. Inactivated
15 October 1991 at Fort Sill, Oklahoma. Assigned 16 February 1997 to the 1st
Armored Division and activated in Germany. Inactivated 15 June 2000 in Germany
and relieved from assignment to the 1st Armored Division. (Hey chief).

Campaign Participation Credit
World War II–EAME
Rhineland
Ardennes-Alsace
Central Europe
Southwest Asia
Defense of Saudi Arabia
Liberation and Defense of Kuwait
Cease-Fire

Decorations
None.

BATTERY D, 25th FIELD ARTILLERY Lineage RA (inactive)
 
Constituted 5 July 1918 in the Regular Army as Battery D, 25th Field Artillery, an
element of the 9th Division. Organized 2 August 1918 at Camp McClellan, Alabama.
Demobilized 8 February 1919 at Camp McClellan, Alabama. Reconstituted 22
December 1920 in the Regular Army as Battery D, 25th Field Artillery (Philippine
Scouts). Organized 26 September 1921 at Fort William McKinley, Philippine
Islands, as an element of the Philippine Division. Inactivated 30 September 1922
at Fort Stotsenburg, Philippine Islands. (25th Field Artillery relieved 1 January
1930 from assignment to the Philippine Division and assigned to the 9th Division;
Philippine Scouts concurrently removed as a parenthetical designation.) Activated
1 December 1934 at Madison Barracks, New York, New York. (25th Field Artillery
relieved 16 October 1939 from assignment to the 9th Division.)
 
Reorganized and redesignated 30 December 1940 as Battery A, 25th Field
Artillery Battalion. Inactivated 21 March 1946 at Camp Kilmer, New Jersey. (25th
Field Artillery Battalion redesignated 1 August 1946 as the 25th Parachute Field
Artillery Battery and activated at Fort Benning, Georgia; inactivated 14 November
1946 at Fort Benning, Georgia.) Former Battery A, 25th Field Artillery Battalion,
redesignated 29 November 1949 as Battery A, 25th Parachute Field Artillery
Battalion; concurrently, consolidated with Battery A, 25th Field Artillery Battalion
(active) (see ANNEX), and consolidated unit designated as Battery A, 25th Field
Artillery Battalion, an element of the 10th Infantry Division. Inactivated 1 July
1957 in Germany and relieved from assignment to the 10th Infantry Division.
Redesignated 31 July 1959 as Headquarters and Headquarters Battery, 4th
Battalion, 25th Artillery. Redesignated 19 June 1964 as Battery D, 25th Artillery.
Activated 25 June 1964 in Germany. Inactivated 5 June 1967 in Germany.
Activated 25 September 1969 in Vietnam. Inactivated 1 August 1970 in Vietnam.
Redesignated 1 September 1971 as Battery D, 25th Field Artillery. Assigned
21 June 1976 to the 1st Infantry Division and activated at Fort Riley, Kansas.
Inactivated 15 September 1995 at Fort Riley, Kansas, and relieved from assignment
to the 1st Infantry Division.
 
Annex
Constituted 19 December 1942 in the Army of the United States as Battery
A, 604th Field Artillery Battalion. Activated 11 January 1943 at Camp Carson,
Colorado. (604th Field Artillery Battalion assigned 15 July 1943 to the 10th
Light Division [later redesignated as the 10th Infantry Division].) Inactivated 10
November 1945 at Camp Carson, Colorado. Redesignated 18 June 1948 as Battery
A, 25th Field Artillery Battalion, and allotted to the Regular Army. Activated 1
July 1948 at Fort Riley, Kansas.

Campaign Participation Credit
 
World War II–EAME
North Apennines
Rhineland
Ardennes‑Alsace
Central Europe
Po Valley
Vietnam
Summer–Fall 1969
Winter–Spring 1970
Sanctuary Counteroffensive
Counteroffensive, Phase VII
Southwest Asia
Defense of Saudi Arabia
Liberation and Defense of Kuwait
Cease-Fire

Decorations
None.

BATTERY E, 25th FIELD ARTILLERY Lineage RA (inactive)
 
Constituted 5 July 1918 in the National Army as Battery E, 25th Field
Artillery, an element of the 9th Division. Organized 2 August 1918 at Camp
McClellan, Alabama. Demobilized 8 February 1919 at Camp McClellan, Alabama.
Reconstituted 22 December 1920 in the Regular Army as Battery E, 25th Field
Artillery (Philippine Scouts). Organized 26 September 1921 at Fort William
McKinley, Philippine Islands, as an element of the Philippine Division. Inactivated
30 September 1922 at Fort Stotsenburg, Philippine Islands. (25th Field Artillery
relieved 1 January 1930 from assignment to the Philippine Division and assigned
to the 9th Division; Philippine Scouts concurrently removed as a parenthetical
designation.) Activated 1 December 1934 at Madison Barracks, New York. (25th
Field Artillery relieved 16 October 1939 from assignment to the 9th Division.)
Reorganized and redesignated 30 December 1940 as Battery B, 25th Field
Artillery Battalion. Inactivated 21 March 1946 at Camp Kilmer, New Jersey. (25th
Field Artillery Battalion redesignated 1 August 1946 as the 25th Parachute Field
Artillery Battery and activated at Fort Benning, Georgia; inactivated 14 November
1946 at Fort Benning, Georgia.) Former Battery B, 25th Field Artillery Battalion,
redesignated 29 November 1949 as Battery B, 25th Parachute Field Artillery
Battalion; concurrently, consolidated with Battery B, 25th Field Artillery Battalion
(active) (see ANNEX), and consolidated unit designated as Battery B, 25th Field
Artillery Battalion, an element of the 10th Infantry Division. Inactivated 1 July
1957 in Germany and relieved from assignment to the 10th Infantry Division.
Redesignated 31 July 1959 as Headquarters and Headquarters Battery, 5th
Battalion, 25th Artillery. Redesignated 1 September 1971 as Headquarters and
Headquarters Battery, 5th Battalion, 25th Field Artillery. Redesignated 20 March
1978 as Battery E, 25th Field Artillery, assigned to the 2d Infantry Division, and
activated in Korea. Inactivated 16 June 1988 in Korea and relieved from assignment
to the 2d Infantry Division.
Annex
Constituted 19 December 1942 in the Army of the United States as Battery
B, 604th Field Artillery Battalion. Activated 11 January 1943 at Camp Carson,
Colorado. (604th Field Artillery Battalion assigned 15 July 1943 to the 10th
Light Division [later redesignated as the 10th Infantry Division].) Inactivated 10
November 1945 at Camp Carson, Colorado. Redesignated 18 June 1949 as Battery
B, 25th Field Artillery Battalion, and allotted to the Regular Army. Activated 1
July 1948 at Fort Riley, Kansas.

Campaign Participation Credit
World War II–EAME
North Apennines
Rhineland
Ardennes‑Alsace
Central Europe
Po Valley

Decorations
None.

BATTERY F, 25th FIELD ARTILLERY Lineage RA (inactive)
 
Constituted 5 July 1918 in the National Army as Battery F, 25th Field
Artillery, an element of the 9th Division. Organized 2 August 1918 at Camp
McClellan, Alabama. Demobilized 8 February 1919 at Camp McClellan, Alabama.
Reconstituted 22 December 1920 in the Regular Army as Battery F, 25th Field
Artillery (Philippine Scouts). Organized 26 September 1921 at Fort William
McKinley, Philippine Islands, as an element of the Philippine Division. Inactivated
30 September 1922 at Fort Stotsenburg, Philippine Islands. (25th Field Artillery
relieved 1 January 1930 from assignment to the Philippine Division and assigned
to the 9th Division; Philippine Scouts concurrently removed as a parenthetical
designation. Relieved 16 October 1939 from assignment to the 9th Division.)
Activated 15 November 1939 at Camp Buchanan, Puerto Rico.
Reorganized and redesignated 30 December 1940 as Battery C, 25th Field
Artillery Battalion. Inactivated 21 March 1946 at Camp Kilmer, New Jersey. (25th
Field Artillery Battalion redesignated 1 August 1946 as the 25th Parachute Field
Artillery Battery and activated at Fort Benning, Georgia; inactivated 14 November
1946 at Fort Benning, Georgia.) Former Battery C, 25th Field Artillery Battalion,
redesignated 29 November 1949 as Battery C, 25th Parachute Field Artillery
Battalion; concurrently, consolidated with Battery C, 25th Field Artillery Battalion
(active) (see ANNEX), and consolidated unit designated as Battery C, 25th Field
Artillery Battalion, an element of the 10th Infantry Division. Inactivated 1 July
1957 in Germany and relieved from assignment to the 10th Infantry Division.
Redesignated 2 June 1958 as Headquarters and Headquarters Battery, 6th
Battalion, 25th Artillery. Redesignated 11 November 1966 as Battery F, 25th
Artillery. Activated 25 January 1967 at Fort Carson, Colorado. Inactivated 25
August 1968 at Fort Carson, Colorado. Redesignated 1 September 1971 as Battery
F, 25th Field Artillery.
 
Annex
Constituted 19 December 1942 in the Army of the United States as Battery
C, 604th Field Artillery Battalion. Activated 11 January 1943 at Camp Carson,
Colorado. (604th Field Artillery Battalion assigned 15 July 1943 to the 10th
Light Division [later redesignated as the 10th Infantry Division].) Inactivated 10
November 1945 at Camp Carson, Colorado. Redesignated 19 June 1948 as Battery
C, 25th Field Artillery Battalion, and allotted to the Regular Army. Activated 1
July 1948 at Fort Riley, Kansas.
 
Campaign Participation Credit
World War II–EAME
North Apennines
Rhineland
Ardennes‑Alsace
Central Europe
Po Valley

Decorations
None.

BATTERY H, 25th FIELD ARTILLERY Lineage RA (inactive)
 
Constituted 5 July 1918 in the National Army as Headquarters, 2d Battalion,
25th Field Artillery, an element of the 9th Division. Organized 2 August 1918 at
Camp McClellan, Alabama. Demobilized 8 February 1919 at Camp McClellan,
Alabama. Reconstituted 22 December 1920 in the Regular Army as Headquarters
and Headquarters Detachment and Combat Train, 2d Battalion, 25th Field Artillery
(Philippine Scouts). Organized 10 November 1921 at Fort William McKinley,
Philippine Islands, as an element of the Philippine Division. Inactivated 30
September 1922 at Fort Stotsenburg, Philippine Islands. Redesignated 1 July
1924 as Headquarters and Headquarters Battery and Combat Train, 2d Battalion,
25th Field Artillery (Philippine Scouts). (25th Field Artillery relieved 1 January
1930 from assignment to the Philippine Division and assigned to the 9th Division;
Philippine Scouts concurrently removed as a parenthetical designation.) Activated
1 December 1934 at Madison Barracks, New York, New York. Redesignated in
December 1938 as Headquarters and Headquarters Battery, 2d Battalion, 25th
Field Artillery (Combat Train concurrently separated from Headquarters and
Headquarters Battery, 2d Battalion, 25th Field Artillery—hereafter separate lineage).
(25th Field Artillery relieved 16 October 1939 from assignment to the 9th
Division.)
 
Absorbed 30 December 1940 by Headquarters and Headquarters Battery,
25th Field Artillery Battalion. (Headquarters and Headquarters Battery, 25th
Field Artillery, reorganized and redesignated 30 December 1940 as Headquarters
and Headquarters Battery, 25th Field Artillery Battalion; inactivated 21 March
1946 at Camp Kilmer, New Jersey [25th Field Artillery Battalion redesignated 1
August 1946 as the 25th Parachute Field Artillery Battery and activated at Fort
Benning, Georgia; inactivated 14 November 1946 at Fort Benning, Georgia];
former Headquarters and Headquarters Battery, 25th Field Artillery Battalion,
redesignated 29 November 1949 as Headquarters and Headquarters Battery, 25th
Parachute Field Artillery Battalion; concurrently, consolidated with Headquarters
and Headquarters Battery, 25th Field Artillery Battalion [active], and consolidated
unit designated as Headquarters and Headquarters Battery, 25th Field Artillery
Battalion, an element of the 10th Infantry Division.) Former Headquarters and
Headquarters Battery, 2d Battalion, 25th Field Artillery, reconstituted 1 July 1957
in the Regular Army.
 
Redesignated 31 July 1959 as Headquarters and Headquarters Battery, 8th
Battalion, 25th Artillery. Activated 27 June 1966 at Fort Bragg, North Carolina.
Inactivated 3 February 1971 at Fort Lewis, Washington. Redesignated 1 September
1971 as Headquarters and Headquarters Battery, 8th Battalion, 25th Field Artillery.
 
Redesignated 16 May 1987 as Battery H, 25th Field Artillery, assigned to the 5th
Infantry Division, and activated at Fort Polk, Louisiana. Relieved 16 December
1992 from assignment to the 5th Infantry Division and assigned to the 2d Armored
Division. Inactivated 15 January 1996 at Fort Hood, Texas, and relieved from
assignment to the 2d Armored Division.
 
Campaign Participation Credit
World War II–EAME
Rhineland
Ardennes-Alsace
Central Europe
Vietnam
Counteroffensive, Phase II
Counteroffensive, Phase III
Tet Counteroffensive
Counteroffensive, Phase IV
Counteroffensive, Phase V
Counteroffensive, Phase VI
Tet 69/Counteroffensive
Summer–Fall 1969
Winter–Spring 1970
Sanctuary Counteroffensive
Counteroffensive, Phase VII
Panama-Operation Just Cause (one Radar Section from the 5th Infantry Division based at Fort Polk)

Decorations
Meritorious Unit Commendation (Army), Streamer embroidered VIETNAM
1966–1967 (Headquarters and Headquarters Battery, 8th Battalion, 25th Artillery,
cited; DA GO 43, 1968)
Meritorious Unit Commendation (Army), Streamer embroidered VIETNAM
1968–1969 (Headquarters and Headquarters Battery, 8th Battalion, 25th Artillery,
cited; DA GO 39, 1970)
Republic of Vietnam Civil Action Honor Medal, First Class, Streamer
embroidered VIETNAM 1966–1971 (Headquarters and Headquarters Battery, 8th
Battalion, 25th Artillery, cited; DA GO 51, 1971)

4th Battalion, 25th Field Artillery Regiment

See also
 Field Artillery Branch (United States)
 10th Mountain Division (United States)

References

 https://web.archive.org/web/20120716225635/http://www.tioh.hqda.pentagon.mil/Heraldry/ArmyDUISSICOA/ArmyHeraldryUnit.aspx?u=5700

External links
 http://www.history.army.mil/html/forcestruc/lineages/branches/fa/default.htm
 https://web.archive.org/web/20130512160326/http://www.drum.army.mil/3rdBCT/Pages/4-25UnitHistory.aspx

025
025
Military units and formations established in 1918